Coleophora staehelinella is a moth of the family Coleophoridae. It is found in southern France and Spain.

The larvae feed on Staehelina dubia. They completely mine a leaf, then make a spatulate leaf case out of the mined material. Because the upperside and underside of the leaf differ in colour, the dorsal and ventral side of the case are also coloured differently. Larvae can be found in spring.

References

staehelinella
Moths of Europe
Moths described in 1891